John Port Spencer Academy, formerly known as John Port School, is an academy and secondary school in the village of Etwall, Derbyshire, England.

Admissions
With the current number of students around the 2100 mark it puts John Port as the largest secondary school in Derbyshire, and one of the largest nationally. The current head-teacher is Karen Squire.

John Port is a mixed gender school, with the student age range between 11 and 18, and with the 6th Form taking students from the ages of 16 to 18. There are approximately 141 full-time and temporary members of the teaching staff.

History

The school is on the site of a demolished country manor, Etwall Hall, Etwall, situated just outside Derby, traditionally of the Port family who were the wealthy landowners/farmers of the parish. In 1952, the Derbyshire County Council bought Etwall Hall from Reg Parnell, the famous racing car driver. The hall had been used during the Second World War by the Army, first as a petrol depot and later as an equipment supply centre and been left in a somewhat dilapidated state. After its demolition a secondary modern, Etwall Secondary School, and a secondary grammar school, John Port Grammar School, were built on the site. In 1965 they were amalgamated to form the John Port School that occupies the site today.

The name of the Port family, who lived at the hall, has been associated with Etwall since the 15th century. The family's most famous son, Sir John Port, was the founder of the nearby Repton School and committed to the furthering of education for young men in the village. It therefore seemed entirely appropriate that the new school was named after him.

School site

The large site has green open spaces between the individual teaching facilities. The centre of the site is focussed around the lake, one of the original fishing ponds that were in the grounds of the Etwall Hall.

Teaching facilities are spread across the site, with each faculty having a separate building. The buildings are mostly named after settlements and features in Derbyshire and the Peak District, with the exceptions to this being Flamsteed, named after a famous local scientist John Flamsteed, and the Jubilee Centre, named to commemorate the Diamond Jubilee of Queen Elizabeth II.

The Learning Resources Centre is situated centrally on the site, occupying most of the ground floor of 'B' block.

The site is also home to the Etwall Leisure Centre, with public access from Hilton Road. This new centre was officially opened on 17 July 2009, although it didn't open to the public till 5 August 2009.  The new facilities include a six-lane 25 m swimming pool, squash courts, fitness suite and large sports hall.

School performance
The school was most recently graded as "Inadequate" by Ofsted in all aspects of the school in a June 2017 inspection report. Numerous failures of the school's leadership were criticised, in particular student safeguarding and welfare, academic performance, the behaviour and moral guidance of students, quality of teaching, sixth form education and lacklustre leadership, causing the then Headmaster Chris Sainsbury to resign after having been suspended. It was placed under "special measures" by Ofsted as a result. The school was inspected in May 2022, and was rated "good".

Ian Pepper - Researcher

 David Willey – American Physics populariser
 Mel Morris – English businessman

John Port Grammar School
 Sir Howard Newby (1959–66) – Sociologist, former head of the Economic and Social Research Council University Vice-Chancellor at Southampton, UWE and currently Liverpool

Catchment area
The size of the school means that it has a very large catchment area, covering 31 parishes of South Derbyshire.

Ash | Barton Blount | Bearwardcote | Boylestone | Burnaston | Church Broughton | Dalbury Lees | Egginton | Etwall | Findern | Foremark | Foston | Hatton | Hilton | Hoon | Marston on Dove | Mickleover | Newton Solney | Osleston | Radbourne | Repton | Rolleston on Dove | Scropton | Stenson | Stretton | Sutton on the Hill | Thurvaston | Trusley | Twyford | Tutbury | Willington

And includes the following primary schools:

 Church Broughton Primary School
 Egginton Primary School
 Etwall Primary School
 Heathfields Primary School
 Findern Primary School
 Hilton Primary School
 Longford Primary School
 Long Lane Primary School
 Mickleover Primary School
 Ravensdale Primary School
 Repton Primary School
 Silverhill Primary School
 Sudbury Primary School
 St Clare Special Needs School
 Willington Primary School

References

External links
 School Website

Educational institutions established in 1952
Academies in Derbyshire
1952 establishments in England
Secondary schools in Derbyshire